The 2009 Wake Forest Demon Deacons football team represented Wake Forest University during the 2009 NCAA Division I FBS football season.  The team was coached by Jim Grobe during his ninth season at the school and played its home games at BB&T Field.  Wake Forest competed in the Atlantic Coast Conference, as they have since the league's inception in 1953.  The Deacons finished the season with a record of 5–7 and 3–5 in ACC play. The Deacons missed out on a bowl game for the first time since the 2005 season.

Before the season

Recruiting
On National Signing Day, the Demon Deacons received letters of intent from 21 players.

Whit Barnes 	OL 	6-4 	270 	Rocky Mount, NC 	Rocky Mount
Tommy Bohanon 	FB 	6-2 	238 	N. Fort Myers, FL 	N. Fort Myers
Devin Bolling 	OL-DL 	6-5 	270 	Lynchburg, VA 	Brookville
Michael Campanaro 	RB 	5-10 	173 	Clarksville, MD 	River Hill
Steven Chase 	OL-DL 	6-7 	270 	Frederick, MD 	Thomas Johnson
Brendan Cross 	QB 	6-2 	198 	Alpharetta, GA 	Chattahoochee
John Gallagher 	DL 	6-4 	252 	Ponte Vedra, FL 	Nease
Josh Harris 	RB 	5-10 	190 	Duncanville, TX 	Duncanville
Justin Jackson 	LB 	6-1 	205 	Rockingham, NC 	Richmond County
Derald "D.J." Jones 	DB 	5-10 	162 	Jacksonville, FL 	First Coast
Duran Lowe 	DB 	5-11 	214 	Plant City, FL 	Plant City
Daniel Mack 	DB 	6-0 	196 	Miami, FL 	Dad Christian
Matt Muncy 	TE 	6-4 	215 	Tazewell, VA 	Tazewell
Jimmy Newman 	P-PK 	6-2 	195 	Oxford, AL 	Oxford
Mike Olson 	LB 	6-3 	215 	Ashburn, VA 	Stone Bridge
Kris Redding 	DL 	6-4 	235 	Douglasville, GA 	Whitefield Academy
Quan Rucker 	WR 	6-0 	185 	Statesville, NC 	West Iredell
Frank Souza 	DL 	6-4 	285 	Ponte Vedra, FL 	Nease
Dominique Tate 	DB 	5-10 	180 	Winston-Salem, NC 	Carver
Zach Thompson 	DE 	6-5 	250 	Ashburn, VA 	Stone Bridge
Nikita Whitlock 	LB 	5-11 	245 	Wylie, TX 	Wylie
Preferred Walk-Ons:
Spencer Bishop TE/LB 6-2 200 FR (HS) Pinehurst, NC (Pinecrest)
Roger Khouri Fullback 6-1 230 FR (HS) Key Biscayne, FL (Ransom Everglades)
Zach Massey TE/FB/LS 6-1 195 FR (HS) Kannapolis, NC (A.L. Brown)
Gray Mazzone Wide Receiver 5-9 170 FR (HS) Cary, NC (Panther Creek)
Josh Strickland Wide Receiver 6-2 185 FR (HS) Winston-Salem, NC (Forsyth Country Day)
Alex Wulfeck Punter 5-9 170 FR (HS) Orange Park, FL (Bolles School)

Schedule

Roster

Coaching staff

Game summaries

Baylor

5 all-time meetings:  Baylor 4–1
Last meeting:  2008 at Baylor (Wake Forest 41, Baylor 13)

Stanford

First all–time meeting.

Elon

9 all-time meetings:  Wake Forest 8–0–1
Last meeting:  1939 in Greensboro (Wake Forest 34, Elon 0)

@ Boston College

16 all-time meetings: Boston College 8–6–2
Last meeting:  2008 at Wake Forest (Boston College 24, Wake Forest 21)

North Carolina State

102 all-time meetings: NC State 61–35–6
Last meeting:  2008 at NC State (NC State 21, Wake Forest 17)

Maryland

57 all-time meetings: Maryland 41–15–1
Last meeting:  2008 at Maryland (Maryland 26, Wake Forest 0)

@ Clemson

74 all-time meetings: Clemson 56–17–1
Last meeting:  2008 at Wake Forest (Wake Forest 12, Clemson 7)

@ Navy

10 all-time meetings: Wake Forest 7–3
Last meeting:  2008 in Washington DC (Wake Forest 29, Navy 19)

Miami

9 all-time meetings: Miami 6–3
Last meeting:  2008 at Miami (Miami 16, Wake Forest 10)

@ Georgia Tech

28 all-time meetings: Georgia Tech 20–8
Last meeting:  2006 in Jacksonville (Wake Forest 9, Georgia Tech 6)

Florida State

27 all-time meetings: Florida State 21–5–1
Last meeting:  2008 at Florida State (Wake Forest 12, Florida State 3)

@ Duke

88 all-time meetings: Duke 53–34–2
Last meeting:  2008 at Wake Forest (Wake Forest 33, Duke 30 OT)

Scores by quarter

References

Wake Forest
Wake Forest Demon Deacons football seasons
Wake Forest Demon Deacons football